Joseph Lloyd (1864–19??) was an English professional golfer who won the third U.S. Open at the Chicago Golf Club in 1897.

Early life
Lloyd grew up playing at Royal Liverpool Golf Club at Hoylake. He was an expert at making and repairing clubs.

Golf career
He was the first golf professional in France, being hired in 1883 at the Pau Golf Club in Pau, France, by Englishmen spending their winters there. One of those Englishmen was John Cumming Macdona, a member at Hoylake and Pau, but who had formed a friendship with Fleetwood Sandeman of the famous Port and Sherry company. Fleetwood Sandeman was the first Captain in 1883 at Hayling Golf Club in Hampshire, where the Sandeman family had a summer house, and Macdona arranged for Joseph Lloyd to become the first professional at Hayling where Lloyd helped lay out the first 9-hole course on the seafront. 'The General', as Lloyd was popularly known, left Hayling after two seasons. From 1895 to 1909 Lloyd spent his summers as the club professional at the Essex County Club, in Manchester, Massachusetts, and was succeeded by Donald Ross as the club professional there. Lloyd retired from the Pau Golf Club in 1925.

Lloyd played in the 1896 U.S. Open, and lead at the halfway point, but finished tied for 7th place 6 strokes behind.

1897 U.S. Open
Lloyd was known as a player capable of extremely long drives and was considered to be one of the longest hitters in his day. In the 1897 tournament, he was trailing entering the final round. He hit a long drive at the 465-yard 18th hole, following by a wonderful brassie shot to within 8 feet of the pin. He proceeded to sink the putt for an eagle 3 on the par-5 hole that gave him a one-stroke victory over Willie Anderson (who would later win four U.S. Opens). No golfer since has won the Open with an eagle on the final hole.

Major championships

Wins (1)

Results timeline
Lloyd played in only the U.S. Open and The Open Championship.

NYF = Tournament not yet founded
DNP = Did not play
WD = Withdrew
"T" indicates a tie for a place
Green background for wins. Yellow background for top-10

References

External links
Golfika page on Joe Lloyd
U.S. Open 1897 page

English male golfers
Winners of men's major golf championships
People from Hoylake
English people of Welsh descent
1864 births
Year of death missing